Aleksidze is a Georgian surname. Notable people with the surname include:

 Levan Aleksidze (1926–2019), Georgian jurist and expert on international law
 Rati Aleksidze (born 1978), Georgian footballer
 Zaza Aleksidze (born 1935), Soviet armenologist

Georgian-language surnames
Patronymic surnames
Surnames from given names